2-Acetylaminofluorene (AAF, 2-AAF) is a carcinogenic and mutagenic derivative of fluorene.  It is used as a biochemical tool in the study of carcinogenesis. It induces tumors in a number of species in the liver, bladder and kidney. The metabolism of this compound in the body by means of biotransformation reactions is the key to its carcinogenicity. 2-AAF is a substrate for cytochrome P-450 (CYP) enzyme, which is a part of a super family found in almost all organisms. This reaction results in the formation of hydroxyacetylaminofluorene which is a proximal carcinogen and is more potent than the parent molecule. The N-hydroxy metabolite undergoes several enzymatic and non-enzymatic rearrangements. It can be O-acetylated by cytosolic N-acetyltransferase enzyme to yield N-acetyl-N-acetoxyaminofluorene. This intermediate can spontaneously rearrange to form the arylamidonium ion and a carbonium ion which can interact directly with DNA to produce DNA adducts. In addition to esterification by acetylation, the N-hydroxy derivative can be O-sulfated by cytosolic sulfur transferase enzyme giving rise to the N-acetyl-N-sulfoxy product.

In addition, the cytosolic N,O-aryl hydroxamic acid acyltransferase enzyme catalyzes the transfer of the acetyl group from the N atom of the N-OH-2-AAF to the O atom of the N-OH group to produce N-acetoxy-2-aminofluorene (N-OH-2-AF). This reactive metabolite spontaneously decomposes to form a nitrenium ion which will also react with DNA. However, the product of this latter reaction is the deacetylated aminofluorene adduct. The interconversion of amide and amine metabolites of 2-AAF can further occur via the microsomal enzyme deacetylase producing the N-hydroxy metabolite of the amine derivative. Subsequent esterification of the aryl hydroxylamine by sulfur transferase yields the sulfate ester which also spontaneously decompose to form nitrenium ion. The reactive nitrenium, carbonium and arylamidonium ion metabolites of 2-AAF react with the nucleophilic groups in DNA, proteins and endogenous thiols like glutathione. Other metabolites such as the N,O-glucuronide, although not directly activated products, can be important in the carcinogenic process because they are capable of degradation to proximal N-hydroxy metabolites. This metabolite is presumed to be involved in formation of bladder tumors. The mechanism for this is thought to involve degradation of glucuronide in the bladder due to acidic pH of urine.

See also
 Acetoxyacetylaminofluorene
 Hydroxyacetylaminofluorene

References 

Carcinogens
Acetamides